This article displays the qualifying draw of the 2011 Farmers Classic.

Players

Seeds

  Tatsuma Ito (second round)
  Rik de Voest (qualifying Competition, retired)
  Marinko Matosevic (second round)
  Yuichi Sugita (second round)
  Tim Smyczek (qualified)
  Chris Guccione (first round)
  Greg Jones (qualified)
  Carsten Ball (second round)

Qualifiers

  Daniel Kosakowski
  Tim Smyczek
  Laurynas Grigelis
  Greg Jones

Qualifying draw

First qualifier

Second qualifier

Third qualifier

Fourth qualifier

References
 Qualifying Draw

2011 - qualifying
Farmers Classic - qualifying